Ram Ratan Sharma is an Indian politician from Bharatiya Jan Sangh. He was elected as a member of 5th Lok Sabha from Banda on Bharatiya Jan Sangh ticket. He was born in a small village Lohra near Banda.

References

1934 births
2018 deaths
India MPs 1971–1977
Bharatiya Jana Sangh politicians
People from Banda district, India
Lok Sabha members from Uttar Pradesh